The Sketches is a Sufi folk rock band from Jamshoro, Sindh, Pakistan, created by young musician Saif Samejo. "Sindhi melody is very charming; there is enormous flexibility of words" says Saif Samejo. Their motherland has always been a major inspiration which is portrayed in their work. The love for their language and culture is aimed to bring back the departed old identity and to produce quality work in order to sensitize the world in general and the youth in specific about the grace of Sindhi language.

Saif Samejo
Saif Samejo is founder and lead vocalist of the Pakistani Sufi/Folk/Rock band The Sketches.

In May 2014 he has opened the first music Aashram (School) in Hyderabad, Sindh named as "Lahooti Music Aashram".
With a consistency The Sketches climbed up the ladder of success in not just parts of Sindh but the entire Pakistan with popular hits; Nind Nashe Vich, Rano, Raat, Main Sufi Hoon, Meena.
Recently a new music album YOU  and a new song Jogi was launched.

Saif collaborated with Mai Dhai to present the original Rajasthani flavor of music besides this he also intended to collaborate with other artist through Lahooti Music Ashram.

Lahooti Live Sessions
 Lahooti Live Sessions launched by Saif Samejo in June 2013, is a weekly activity where different musicians from Sindh gather at Samejo's place to play live music.The audio and video of the performances is recorded and released on social media. Samejo himself is the front man of the Jamshoro-based rock band The Sketches, and the Lahooti Sessions are in the vein of something that he has wanted to do for a long time; cultural preservation in its most unadulterated form. Lahooti live sessions appears as a dream come true for him.

"The aim was not only to record these musicians, but to do so in the highest possible audio-visual quality so that they can be presented in an equally good manner on social media," Samejo adds.

Around 50 different folk musicians have been recorded and released as part of the Lahooti live sessions and most of them have never been exposed to the camera or the recording equipment before. Some prominent names include Mai Dhai, Zulfiqar Fakir, Arieb Azhar, band Bell, two Changg players from Thatta – Ali Mohammad and Feroz Roonjho, Manjhi Faqeer, Talib Talari, Mai Hanjoo and Mohammad Hassan.

Lahooti Music Aashram

 The Lahooti School of music is an extension of the Lahooti Live Sessions that Saif started a year ago, with the intent of preserving indigenous instruments and instrumentalists. Lahooti music School named as Lahooti Music Aashram is the first proper music School in Hyderabad/Jamshoro inaugurated in May 2014.

The school offers a thirty-six-hour learning module in keyboards, guitars, bass guitars and drums amongst western instruments and chung, boreendo, shehnai, danbooro, sarangi, narr, sitar, flute and dholak/tabla, along with other percussion instruments closer to home. Later on the students who show interest in the field of music production will also be provided with studio facilities to harness their skills.

Music

Albums

Dastkari
Their first album ‘Dastkari’ meaning ‘one’s own creation’ was released in 2010 with the Folk/Sufi/Rock songs in Sindhi, Saraiki and Urdu bearing a wide range of messages promoting peace, a rich cultural heritage, freedom of expression and love. The music created by The Sketches has proved the fact that "Music has no language", despite the fact that different languages have been used in their songs listeners from different age groups and backgrounds have appreciated each flavor that come out. The music blends so perfectly, creating novel symphonies that capture the soul.

YOتون
The Band released their second full-length album YOU in 2016. Since 2015, the band was busy working on their second album – this album. Saif says this album doesn't just reflect their musical journey but the spiritual growth of the artistes as well.

"These were the years of reflection, of contemplation, of growth," says Saif. "The world was only getting more divided, more isolated. If we were to find meaning of life we were find it here, in our everyday reality no matter how harsh that be. We couldn't wait for the world to get better. But once this realization struck us, we were suddenly able to appreciate the small joys of life with more gratitude. We were able to celebrate the brief moments of love and cherish them as long as they last. YOU, album is an effort to celebrate those moments, the moments of love and beatitude, that float by unnoticed in our everyday lives. YOU, is the celebration of everything that makes life, with all its brutality and transience, so precious."

Language
The main language is Sindhi but some songs are also in  English and Urdu.

Singles
 Darawar (The Dravidians), this song is against the religious extremism
 Dastan Sassui, about the Sassue Punhoo
 Maujood,
 Bol Pakhee
 Nind Nashy vich
 Jogi, a Sufi song .
 Meena (English subtitle), was nominated for the Hum Awards

Band Members
Current members
Saif Samejo – lead vocals, backing vocals (2003–present)
Nomi Ali – backing vocals, rhythm guitar, Keyboard (2012–present)
Atif Kalyar – Lead guitars (2014–present)
Roshan Sharma – lead guitar, rhythm guitar (2017–present)

Session members
 Ajay Harry – drums (2016–present)
 Saif Abbas – bass (2017–present)

Timeline

See also 
 List of Pakistani music bands

References

External links
 The Sketches (SoundCloud)
 The Sketches (Vimeo)
 The Sketches (Jamali4uweb.com)
 Sketches (Pakium)
 THE SKETCHES! - Musician/Band | Facebook

Sufi music
Sindhi music